Axel Sveinsson (3 April 1896 - 12 August 1957) was a civil engineer, having received his engineering degree in Copenhagen in 1927.
He is noted for having designed several lighthouses in Iceland; these include the lighthouses at Hólmsbergsviti, Garðskagi, Þrídrangaviti and Knarrarós. A postage stamp depicting the Vattarnes lighthouse at Reyðarfjörður, which was designed by Axel, was issued in 2013.

Notes

1896 births
1957 deaths
Icelandic civil engineers
20th-century engineers